Kerpen (Ripuarian: Kerpe) is the most populated town in the Rhein-Erft-Kreis (North Rhine-Westphalia, Germany). It is located about 20 kilometres southwest from Cologne. Kerpen has a total population of 69.530 (2022).

Division of the town
The town of Kerpen was created in 1975, when the previously independent municipalities Balkhausen, Blatzheim, Brüggen, Buir, Horrem, Kerpen, Manheim, Mödrath, Sindorf and Türnich were merged.

Monuments
 Burg Bergerhausen
 Burg Loersfeld
 Schloss Türnich

Notable people
 Adolph Kolping (1813–1865), Catholic priest and social reformer 
 Wolfgang von Trips (1928–1961), Formula One motor racing driver 
 Karlheinz Stockhausen (1928–2007), pioneer of electronic music composition
 Franz-Peter Hofmeister, Olympic medalist in the 4 × 400 m relay
 Michael Schumacher, 7 time Formula One world champion
 Ralf Schumacher, brother of Michael, both have emulated von Trips in achieving success in Formula One
 Patrice Bart-Williams is an acclaimed reggae artist

Education
In 2008, Gymnasium der Stadt Kerpen was considered the largest school in Germany.

Twin towns – sister cities

Kerpen is twinned with:
 St. Vith, Belgium (1975)
 Oświęcim, Poland (1997)

References

External links
 

Towns in North Rhine-Westphalia
Rhein-Erft-Kreis